Damiano Zoffoli (17 July 1960) is an Italian politician. He was from  1997 to 2005 mayor of Cesenatico for the Christian-leftist Italian People's Party and The Daisy. In February 2015 he replaced Alessandra Moretti as a Member of the European Parliament (MEP) representing the Democratic Party in the constituency of North East Italy.

In parliament, Zoffoli has been a member of the Progressive Alliance of Socialists and Democrats group. Since 2015, he has been a member of the Committee on the Environment, Public Health and Food Safety. In addition to his committee assignments, has been serving as vice-chairman of the parliament's delegation for relations with Iran.

See also
 2014 European Parliament election in Veneto

External links 

European Parliament - Alessandra Moretti

1960 births
Living people
Democratic Party (Italy) MEPs
Democratic Party (Italy) politicians
MEPs for Italy 2014–2019
21st-century Italian politicians